Air Niugini Flight 73 was a scheduled service from Pohnpei, Federated States of Micronesia (FSM) to Port Moresby, Papua New Guinea, via Chuuk, FSM. On September 28, 2018, the flight, operated by a Boeing 737, landed short of the runway at Chuuk International Airport in Weno (FSM) and came to rest in Chuuk Lagoon. Locals in small boats rescued most passengers and all crew members. One passenger was initially declared missing. He was later found dead by rescue divers. Forty-six people survived but six of them were injured.

Aircraft and crew

The accident aircraft was a Boeing 737-8BK, registration P2-PXE, msn 33024, Boeing line number 1688. It had first flown on 1 April 2005. The aircraft was powered by two CFM International CFM56-7B26 engines. At the time of the accident, the aircraft had accumulated 37,160 hours and 36 minutes flight time in 14,788 cycles.

The aircraft was originally registered VT-AXC for Air India Express and was delivered on 19 April 2005. On 6 July 2005, it was damaged in a runway excursion on landing at Cochin International Airport, India. On 29 July 2010, the aircraft was sold to Jet Airways and was registered VT-JBT. It was sold to CIT Leasing Corporation on 24 July 2013 and registered M-ABGK before being sold to Loftleidir, which leased the aircraft to Air Niugini on 13 September 2013. The aircraft was registered P2-PXE. On 12 May 2018, it was struck by Lockheed L-100 Hercules N403LC of Lynden Air Cargo whilst parked at Port Moresby Airport, sustaining damage to its right winglet.

The captain and pilot in command was a 52-year-old Papua New Guinean male who had 19,780 flight hours, including 2,276 hours on the Boeing 737. The first officer was a 35-year-old Australian male who had 4,618 flight hours, with 368 of them on the Boeing 737. An engineer from Loftleidir was also on board and was sitting in the cockpit jumpseat. He was filming the landing for recreation purposes using his cell phone. The phone survived the accident and the video was used for the subsequent investigation.

Accident
The aircraft was operating an internationally scheduled passenger flight from Pohnpei Airport, FSM to Port Moresby Airport, Papua New Guinea via Chuuk International Airport, FSM. At 10:10 local time (00:10 UTC), the aircraft landed in the Chuuk lagoon  short of Chuuk International Airport. Initial reports stated that all twelve crew and 35 passengers were rescued by local boats and United States Navy personnel. However, a male Indonesian passenger was reported missing after the evacuation. Three days of searching failed to locate the missing passenger seated at 23A, and the investigating commission requested a verification search of the airplane. On 1 October 2018, experienced Japanese divers located the passenger between partially submerged seat rows 22 and 23, in the vicinity of a fuselage fracture.
The one dead passenger had not been wearing a seatbelt. Air Niugini had previously stated that the deceased passenger had been seen by other passengers evacuating the aircraft. Nine people were taken to hospital. Six passengers were seriously injured. Some of the injured sustained broken bones. It was reported that there were thunderstorms in the vicinity of the airport at the time of the accident.

Investigation
The Papua New Guinea Accident Investigation Commission opened an investigation into the accident.

The Department of Transportation, Communications & Infrastructure in the Federated States of Micronesia opened an investigation. A preliminary report was issued on October 26. It stated that the body of the deceased passenger was recovered from the aircraft.  Pathological analysis found that the passenger had succumbed to injuries within 3 minutes of the impact. An autopsy determined that there was a lack of trauma around the waist and hips, indicating that the passenger "was not wearing a seat-belt" at the time of the crash, "which allowed his body to become a projectile sustaining traumatic head and facial injuries".

On 18 July 2019, the Papua New Guinea Accident Investigation Commission issued its final report: the flight crew did not comply with Air Niugini Standard Operating Procedures, nor the approach or pre-landing checklists, and did not adequately brief the approach. The flight path became unstable after autopilot disconnect. The Precision Approach Path Indicator was showing three white lights just before entering Instrument Meteorological Conditions (IMC). The rate of descent significantly exceeded  in IMC. The glideslope deviated from half dot low to two dots high within nine seconds after passing the Minimum Descent Altitude. The flight crew heard, but disregarded, thirteen Enhanced Ground Proximity Warning System (EGPWS) aural alerts (Glideslope and Sink Rate) and flew a 4.5° average glideslope. EGPWS showed a visual PULL UP warning on the Primary Flight Display. The pilots lost situational awareness. The approach was unstabilised, but the captain did not execute a missed approach. The copilot was ineffective and oblivious to the rapidly unfolding unsafe situation. A continuous WHOOP WHOOP PULL UP aural warning could have been effective in alerting the crew of the imminent danger.

The final report stated confusion led to a botched evacuation of the airplane. According to cabin crew members, the word 'evacuate' was not understood by some of the passengers. Several passengers took their cabin baggage with them against instructions. The US Navy divers allowed a passenger to re-enter the aircraft and move forward to retrieve his shoes. However some cabin crew members acted with conspicuous courage, retrieving passengers lying under water in the aisle or still strapped in their seats. The report concluded the Papua New Guinea Civil Aviation Safety Authority "did not meet the high standard of evidence-based assessment required for safety assurance, resulting in numerous deficiencies and errors".

See also

Lion Air Flight 904- A Boeing 737 that crashed in similar circumstances in April, 2013

References

External links 

 

2018 in the Federated States of Micronesia
Accidents and incidents involving the Boeing 737 Next Generation
Aviation accidents and incidents in 2018
Aviation accidents and incidents in the Federated States of Micronesia
September 2018 events in Oceania
Airliner accidents and incidents involving ditching